The common blanket octopus or violet blanket octopus (Tremoctopus violaceus) is a large octopus of the family Tremoctopodidae found worldwide in the epipelagic zone of warm seas. The degree of sexual dimorphism in this species is very high, with females growing up to two meters in length, whereas males grow to about 2.4 cm. The first live specimen of a male was not seen until 2002 off the Great Barrier Reef. Individual weights of males and females differ by a factor of about 10,000 and potentially more. 

Males and small females of less than 7 cm have been reported to carry with them the tentacles of the Portuguese man o' war. It is speculated that these tentacles serve both as a defensive mechanism and possibly as a method of capturing prey. This mechanism is no longer useful at larger sizes, which may be why males of this species are so small. The web between the arms of the mature female octopus serves as a defensive measure as well, making the animal appear larger, and being easily detached if bitten into by a predator. The complete mitogenome of T. violaceus is a circular double-stranded DNA sequence that is 16,015 base-pairs long.

Mating behaviour
The third right arm in male blanket octopus is called the hectocotylus, which has a sperm-filled pouch between the arms. When the male is ready to mate, the pouch ruptures, and sperm is released into the arm. He then cuts this arm off and gives it to a female. It is likely that the male dies after mating. The female stores the arm in her mantle to be used when she is ready to fertilize her eggs. She may store several hectocotyluses from different males at once.

Sexual dimorphism
The common blanket octopus exhibits one of the highest degrees of sexual size-dimorphism found in large animals. There are several theories as to why this developed. It is advantageous for females to be big; their large eggs take a lot of energy to maintain. The bigger a female is, the more eggs she can carry, and she can birth more offspring that could potentially survive to adulthood. Sperm does not require much energy or space to maintain, so males do not face the same pressure to be big. The use of the Portuguese man o' war tentacles is effective only in smaller animals. So selection may have favoured males to remain small in order to continue to utilize this defence mechanism.

Defense mechanisms 
Predators of the common blanket octopus include the blue shark, tuna, and the billfish. Female blanket octopuses can roll up and unfurl their webbed blanket as needed. The blanket serves to make the octopus look bigger, and the females can also sever the blanket off to distract predators.

The male blanket octopuses was first observed to be using Portuguese man o' war stingers in 1963. The octopus has Portuguese man o' war tentacles attached to its four dorsal arms. It is unknown whether the blanket octopus is immune to the toxins in the stingers or if they only hold the stingers at insensitive tissue. The use of these tentacles could serve both as defensive and offensive mechanisms. The toxin from the Portuguese man o' war wards off predators, but it could also be used to catch prey.

References

Further reading 

Octopuses
Cephalopods of North America
Cephalopods of Oceania
Cephalopods described in 1830
Taxa named by Stefano delle Chiaje